Al-Araf  (The Heights) is the 7th chapter (sūrah) of the Qur'an, with 206 verses (āyāt). Regarding the timing and contextual background of the revelation (Asbāb al-nuzūl), it is a "Meccan surah", which means it is believed to have been revealed in Mecca.

This chapter takes its name from verses 46–47, in which the word A'araf appears.

According to Abul A'la Maududi, the time of its disclosure is about the same as that of Al-An'am, i. e., the last year of the Islamic prophet Muhammad's residence at Makkah: the manner of its admonition clearly indicates that it belongs to the same period and both have the same historical background; however, it cannot be declared with assurance which of these two was uncovered before the other. The audience should keep in mind the introduction to Al-An'am.

Summary

1-2 Allah tells Muhammad not to doubt the Quran 
3 The people exhorted to believe in it 
4-5 Many cities destroyed for their unbelief 
6-9 Prophets and their hearers on the judgment-day 
10 The ingratitude of infidels 
11 The creation of Adam 
11-12 Satan refuses to obey Allah by bowing to Adam 13 He is driven from Paradise 14-15 He is respited until the resurrection 16-17 He avows his purpose to beguile man 18 God threatens Satan and his victims 
19-24 The fall of Adam and Eve 25-26 They are expelled from Paradise 
27-29 Indecent customs condemned 30-31 God to be sought in prayer 32-34 True worshippers to be decently clad 
35 Every nation has a fixed term of life 
36-42 The doom of those who reject the apostles of God
43-45 The blessed reward of true believers 
45-46 God's curse on the infidels 
47-50 The veil of Aráf and its inhabitants 
51-52 The rejecters of God's apostles to be forgotten 
53- 54 A warning against rejecting Muhammad 
55-59 The Creator and Lord of the worlds to be served 
The History of Noah 
60-65 Noah rejected by his people—their fate 
 The History of Hūd 
 66-73 Húd rejected by the Ádites—their fate The History of Sálih74-80 Sálih rejected by the Thamúdites—their destruction The Story of Lot81-85 Lot rejected and the Sodomites destroyed The History of Shuaib86-94 Shuaib rejected by the Madianites, and their doom  God speaks about other nations in the past95-96 Unbelievers at Makkah unaffected either by adversity or prosperity 97-101 The dreadful fate of those cities who rejected the apostles of God and charged them with imposture 102-103 They are reprobated  The story of Moses104-105 Moses is sent to Pharaoh and his princes 106-108 The miracles of the serpent and leprous hand 109-115 The magicians of Egypt called 116-120 Contest by miracles between Moses and the magicians 121-123 Several magicians converted to Moses 124-127 Pharaoh's anger kindled against them 128 Pharaoh and his princes persecute Moses and his people129-130 Moses exhorts his people to patient trust in God131-132 Adversity and prosperity alike unavailing to bring Pharaoh to repentance133-134 The Egyptian unbelievers plagued135 The hypocrisy of the Egyptians136 They are destroyed in the Red Sea137 The people of Moses triumph, and possess the eastern and western land138-141 The children of Israel become idolatrous142 Moses makes Aaron his deputy, and fasts forty days143 He desires to see the glory of God, but repents his rashness144-145 God gives Moses the law on two tables146-147 Infidels threatened for calling their prophets impostors148 The people of Moses worship the golden calf149 They repent their sin150 Moses in indignation assaults Aaron151 He prays for forgiveness for himself and Aaron152 He calls for vengeance on the idolaters153 God merciful to believers154 Moses's anger is appeased155 He chooses seventy elders155-156 Moses prays for deliverance from destruction by lightning156-159 The Illiterate Prophet foretold by Moses 160 Some Jews rightly directed 161 The Israelites divided into twelve tribes 161 The rock smitten, and manna and quails given 162-163 The command to enter the city saying Hittatun, and the fate of the disobedient 164-167 The Sabbath-breakers changed into apes 168-169 Dispersion of the Jews among the nations 170-171 Some of their successors faithful to the law of Moses 172 God shakes Mount Sinai over the Israelites  God mentioned other topics 173-175 God's covenant with the children of Adam 176-179 The curse of Balaam a warning to infidels 180 Many genii and men created for hell 181-182 The names of God not to be travestied 183-184 God's method of leading infidels to destruction 185 Muhammad not possessed of a devil 186 No hope for the reprobate 187 The coming of the “last hour” sudden 188 Muhammad no seer, only a preacher 189-190  guilty of idolatry 191-198 The folly of idolatry 199 Muhammad commanded to use moderation 200-201 He is to repel Satan by using the name of God 202 The people of Makkah incorrigible 203 They charge Muhammad with imposture 204 ۩ 206 The Quran to be listened to in silence and holy meditation

Subject matter
Although heading of the subject matter of this surah can be summarized as "Invitation to the Divine Message", some further elaboration is required to comprehend the underlying themes and their interconnection.

Contents
The chapter refers to Adam and Eve, Noah, Lot,  Hud, Saleh, Shuaib, Moses and Aaron. The significant issues, Divine laws and points of guidance in this surah are as follows 

 A greeting is given to the People of the Book (Jews and Christians) to become Muslims.  
  
 An admonition is given to the unbelievers about the results of their disavowal through referring to the case of punishments which were caused upon previous nations for their off-base mentality towards their Rasools.  
  
 The Jews are cautioned about the results of their deceptive lead towards the prophets.  
  
 Precept to proliferate the message of Islam with astuteness.  
  
 The fact that the Rasools just as the individuals to whom they are sent will be addressed on the Day of Judgment.  
  
 Precept to the Believers that they should wear respectable and appropriate dress and eat pure and good food.  
  
 Conversation between the inhabitants of Paradise, the prisoners of hell and the individuals of A'raf (a spot between the Paradise and hellfire).  
  
 Luxuriousness and difficulty are the reminders from Allah.  
  
 Muhammad is the Rasool for the entirety of humankind.  
  
 The fact that the coming of Muhammad was depicted in Torah and the Gospel (Bible).  
  
 Jews have created fabricated a wrong belief about Allah's creation.  
  
 Humankind's declaration about Allah at the hour of Adam's creation.  
  
 Allah made all of humankind from a single soul.  
  
 Allah's command to show forgiveness, speak for justice and stay away from the ignorant.  
  
 Allah's order about tuning in to the recitation of The Qur'an with complete quietness.

Theme 
The chief subject of this Surah is an invitation to the Divine Message sent down to Muhammad. The Messenger had been admonishing the individuals of Makkah for 13 years. Yet there was no substantial impact on them, since they had deliberately ignored his message. And had become so adversarial that Allah was going to order Muhammad to disregard them and go to others. That is the reason they are being reproved to acknowledge the message and an admonition is given about the results of their off-base demeanor. Since Muhammad was going to get Allah's edict to relocate from Makkah, the finishing up part of this Surah addresses the People of the Book with whom he was going to come into contact at Al-Madinah. In the ayaat directed to the Jews, the outcomes of their deceptive mentality towards the prophets are likewise brought up clearly. As they proclaimed to put belief in Musa (Moses) yet their practices were against his lessons. They were defying him as well as were in certainty worshipping falsehood.

Towards the ending of the Surah, guidelines are given to Muhammad and his adherents to show tolerance and exercise patience in answer to the incitements of their rivals. Since the devotees were feeling the squeeze and stress, are encouraged to be cautious and not make any stride that may hurt their cause.

Exegesis
80-84 Lot in Islam

Verses 7:80–84 deal with the story Lot who was sent to a city, that, according to the quranic narrative, was of the transgressors. Angels descend to protect Lot and his daughters, and the city is destroyed by a stone rain. Lot's wife perishes as well.  Lot was sent to a group of people who had committed unprecedented levels of immorality. The men amongst them approached other men with desire instead of women; and thus they were transgressing the bounds of God. Upon hearing the accusation that Prophet Lot had leveled on them, his people gave no answer but this: they said, "Drive them out of your city: these are indeed men who want to be clean and pure!" (the second part of the statement was probably a form of sarcasm). In the end, Allah saved Prophet Lot and his family except his wife who was amongst the evildoers and Allah punished the people by sending a rain of stones down on them.

103-156 Moses
The narrative focuses on the history of Moses

142 Golden Calf
The incident of the Golden Calf as narrated in Q7:142' paints  a positive light on Aaron. The Quran says that Aaron was entrusted the leadership of Israel while Moses was up on Mount Sinai (tur sina’) for a period of forty days . Q19:50  adds that Aaron tried his best to stop the worship of the Golden Calf. Further parts of the story are to be found in Quran 7:150. The story ends in an earlier chapter, Quran 5:25.

157  The coming of Muhammad 
Verse 7:157 reveals that prophecies about the coming of Muhammad were present in the Jewish law and Gospel.

۩ 206 Prostration 
This final verse, verse 206, requires a sajdah, or prostration.

۝ Moreover the angels who are with my LORD do not proudly disdain his service, but they celebrate his praise and worship him.Sahih International:  Indeed, those who are near your Lord are not prevented by arrogance from His worship, and they exalt Him, and to Him they prostrate. Note the inclusion of the Islamic Symbol, ۩ in the Arabic script.

Gallery

See alsoAl Aaraaf'' — a poem based on it by Edgar Allan Poe
 Limbo
 Purgatory

References

External links

Quran 7 Clear Quran translation 
Surah Al-A'raf Mp3

A'raf
Islam articles needing attention
Satan
Adam and Eve